SS Princess Mary was a passenger vessel in the coastal service fleet of the Canadian Pacific Railway (CPR) during the first half of the 20th century.

This ship was called a "pocket liner" because she  offered amenities like a great ocean liner, but on a smaller scale.  The ship was part of the CPR "Princess fleet,"  which was composed of ships having names which began with the title "Princess".  Along with the SS Princess Adelaide the SS Princess Alice and the SS Princess Sophia, the SS Princess Mary was one of four similar ships built for CPR during 1910–11.

History
Princess Mary was built by Bow, McLachlan and Company of Paisley, Scotland for the Canadian Pacific Railway.

On March 14, 1911, the Princess Mary made her first trip on the Nanaimo-Comox–Vancouver service.

A highlight of Princess Mary′s service occurred on February 15, 1915, when the 30th Battalion of the Canadian Expeditionary Force (CEF) embarked on her at Victoria, British Columbia, to begin its journey to Europe for World War I service.

In 1952, Princess Mary was removed from the active service list. She was converted into a  barge.

When she was converted into a barge, part of Princess Mary′s superstructure was beached on Harbour Road in West Victoria, British Columbia, across the street from the Point Hope Shipyard. The superstructure became the Princess Mary Restaurant, which later moved to a different location in West Victoria. Plans were made to save the vacated superstructure and move it to Powell River, British Columbia, but the move never took place. In 2011, the superstructure was torn down to make room for development.

See also
 CP Ships
 List of ocean liners
 List of ships in British Columbia

Notes

References 
 Musk, George. (1981).  Canadian Pacific: The Story of the Famous Shipping Line.  Newton Abbot, Devon: David & Charles. ;  OCLC 7523720

1910 ships
Ocean liners
Steamships of Canada
Ships of CP Ships
Troopships of Canada
Ships built in Govan